Acleris orphnocycla is a species of moth of the family Tortricidae. It is found in China (Yunnan), Kashmir and India (Punjab, Uttarakhand).

The wingspan is about 19 mm.

The larvae feed on Coriaria species.

References

Moths described in 1937
orphnocycla
Moths of Asia